Patriarch Gerasimus or Patriarch Gerasimos may refer to:

 Gerasimus I of Constantinople, Ecumenical Patriarch in 1320–1321
 Patriarch Gerasimus I of Alexandria, ruled in 1620–1636
 Gerasimus I, Serbian Patriarch, Archbishop of Peć and Serbian Patriarch in 1574–1586
 Gerasimus II of Constantinople, Ecumenical Patriarch in 1673–1674
 Patriarch Gerasimus II (Palladas) of Alexandria, Greek Patriarch of Alexandria in 1688–1710
 Patriarch Gerasimus III of Alexandria, ruled in 1783–1788
 Gerasimus III of Constantinople, Ecumenical Patriarch in 1794–1797

See also 
 Gerasimos
 Gerasim